"When It's Over" was a song written by band members Paul Dean and Mike Reno, released by the rock band Loverboy from their album Get Lucky in 1981. Nancy Nash on background vocals. Single Edit played on many pop radio stations was 3:55. Relying heavily on synthesizers, the song became a Top 40 hit for the band when released as a single the following year, peaking at #26 on the charts for two weeks in June 1982.

Billboard called it a "catchy midtempo rocker."

Charts

References

1982 singles
Loverboy songs
Rock ballads
Song recordings produced by Bruce Fairbairn
Songs written by Paul Dean (guitarist)
Songs written by Mike Reno
1981 songs